Waterloo Records is an independent music and video retailer in Austin, Texas, which has been an integral part of Austin's 
music scene since 1982. The store provides a large selection of new and used CDs, vinyl records, DVDs, Blu-rays, turntables, music-related magazines, t-shirts, and other memorabilia. Waterloo is known for their knowledgeable staff, the ability to listen to anything in the store, and its support of Texas music.

The store takes its name, "Waterloo," from the original name of Austin, briefly adopted in 1839 after being designated as the new capital of the Republic of Texas. The store is located at 600A North Lamar Boulevard at the intersection of West 6th Street and North Lamar.

Waterloo regularly hosts in-store performances featuring live performances by local and internationally known artists of all genres, especially during the South by Southwest conferences and festivals during which they host up to 10 bands a day at their festival. Past in-store performers have included Willie Nelson, The Stooges, Sonic Youth, Nirvana, Spoon, Steve Earle, My Morning Jacket, Cheap Trick, Jeff Buckley, My Bloody Valentine, Sebadoh, Alejandro Escovedo (a former Waterloo Records employee), Queens of the Stone Age, Norah Jones, Iron and Wine, The Shins, Animal Collective, Grizzly Bear, Bill Callahan, The Black Angels, Deertick, Wild Flag, St. Vincent, The Sword, Billy Squier, Man Man, and thousands more.

The Austin Chronicle has awarded the title "Best Record Store" in its Best of Austin awards to Waterloo Records every year since the store opened. Waterloo Records is also frequently listed alongside similar music stores such as California's Amoeba Music as one of the best record stores in the United States.

See also

 List of companies based in Austin, Texas

References

External links
 Waterloo Records & Video
 Waterloo's instore performance channel
 Waterloo's Facebook page

Music retailers of the United States
Culture of Austin, Texas
Independent stores
Companies based in Austin, Texas
Retail companies established in 1982
1982 establishments in Texas